The first family of the Republic of China is an informal reference to the immediate family of the president of the Republic of China, who is the head of state of the Republic of China. Members of the first family consist of the president, their spouse, and any of their children.

List of first families

List of spouses of the president of the Republic of China

Children of the president of the Republic of China

Chiang Kai-shek

with Mao Fumei

adopted

Yen Chia-kan and Liu Chi-chun
 Five sons:
 Four daughters:

Chiang Ching-kuo

with Chiang Fang-liang

with Chang Ya-juo

Lee Teng-hui and Tseng Wen-hui
 One son:
Lee Hsien-wen (1950-1982)
 Two daughters:
Anna Lee, Annie Lee

Chen Shui-bian and Wu Shu-chen

Ma Ying-jeou and Christine Chow Ma

References

Republic of China
Presidency of the Republic of China